WMDR-FM, known as "God's Country", is an American FM radio station licensed to Oakland, Maine located at 88.9 FM with a Southern Gospel and Christian country format for the Augusta-Waterville, Portland, Lewiston-Auburn and Northeastern New Hampshire areas It has been on the air since December 2005 and is part of the Worship Radio Network. In March 2007, the station inherited the Southern Gospel format on WMDR (AM) with the Contemporary Christian format moving to the AM WMDR.

Despite the name, the "God's Country" stations have no affiliation with the God's Country Radio Network.

Translators

In addition to the main station, WMDR-FM is relayed by the following translators:

In 2010 God's Country significantly expanded its signal, with a power upgrade and a transmitter move from Skowhegan, Maine to near Norway, Maine as well as signing on a full powered rebroadcaster, WWLN in Lincoln, Maine. With the power upgrade to WMDR-FM and the addition of WWLN, several broadcast translators that previously simulcasted WMDR-FM switched to a simulcast of WWWA. In 2012 more full power rebroadcasters went on the air including WRPB Benedicta and WRNM Ellsworth.

External links
 

MDR-FM
Southern Gospel radio stations in the United States
Radio stations established in 2005
Mass media in Kennebec County, Maine
Oakland, Maine